Pontibacillus marinus is a Gram-positive, moderately halophilic and rod-shaped bacterium from the genus of Pontibacillus which has been isolated from soil from a saltern in Korea.

References

 

Bacillaceae
Bacteria described in 2005